Jeffrey Patrick Atkinson (born February 24, 1963) is a male former middle distance runner from the United States. He has held the outdoor mile record at Stanford University since 1986. He was the fastest American male in the 1500 metres in 1989. He competed at the Summer Olympics in 1988 in Seoul, South Korea, and came in tenth place in the 1500m race. He tried to make a comeback at the 1992 Summer Olympics in Barcelona, but did not pass the Olympic trials.

Coaching
Atkinson currently holds coaching positions in both cross country and track and field at San Pedro High School in San Pedro, California. At Mira Costa, Atkinson worked with the head coach of cross country, Roberto Calderon, starting in 2015. Along with fellow head coach Brian Shapiro, he coached both the boys' and girls' cross country program at Palos Verdes to much success in 2007, when both varsity teams competed in both the Division III CIF Southern Section Finals and State Championships. The boys have since won a CIF-SS title and a CIF State Championship titles in 2009 and 2011 (setting record team times for Division III) and gone on to compete at the Nike Cross Nationals in 2009. The girls also won a Southern Section title in 2010, 2011, 2013 and 2014 and CIF State Championship title in 2011 and 2014 under Atkinson.

Stanford track record
3:55.16 Mile, 1986 (outdoors)

Former United States track record holder
1500m: 3:38.12 in 1989 (record was broken by Bernard Lagat in 2005) – indoor American record

Personal records
800m: 1:48 
1500m: 3:35.15 
Mile: 3:52.80 
5km road: 14:01 
10km road: 29:56 
Marathon: 2:46

Marathon career
2005: won Catalina Marathon in 3:05:27 which today is the masters' record.

References

External links

1963 births
Living people
American male middle-distance runners
American track and field coaches
Athletes (track and field) at the 1988 Summer Olympics
Olympic track and field athletes of the United States
Sports coaches from California
Sportspeople from Manhattan Beach, California
Stanford Cardinal men's track and field athletes
Stanford University alumni
Track and field athletes from California
World Athletics Indoor Championships medalists
20th-century American people